Eretmocera arabica is a moth of the family Scythrididae. It was described by Hans Georg Amsel in 1961. It is found in Yemen.

References

arabica
Moths described in 1961
Taxa named by Hans Georg Amsel